The following is a list of lists of programming blocks.

Listings by name and date
 List of programming blocks by name

Listings by genre or characteristic
 List of animated programming blocks

Listings by company
 List of Disney TV programming blocks

Listings by television network
 List of programming blocks by Cartoon Network (Philippines)
 List of programming blocks by YTV
 Cartoon Network (Australia and New Zealand)
 List of programming blocks by Cartoon Network (UK & Ireland)
 List of programming blocks by Nickelodeon
 List of programming blocks by Cartoon Network (Latin America)
 List of programming blocks by Cartoon Network
 List of programming blocks by Teletoon